George T Birks is an English former fencer.

Fencing career
He represented England and won a gold medal in the team sabre at the 1962 British Empire and Commonwealth Games in Perth, Western Australia.

He was a member of the London Polytechnic Fencing Club where he was a pupil of Bela Imregi.

References

Living people
British male fencers
Commonwealth Games medallists in fencing
Commonwealth Games gold medallists for England
Fencers at the 1962 British Empire and Commonwealth Games
Year of birth missing (living people)
Medallists at the 1962 British Empire and Commonwealth Games